Di Maio is an Italian surname. Notable people with the surname include:

 Luigi Di Maio (born 1986), Italian politician
 Roberto Di Maio (born 1982), Italian-born Sammarinese footballer
 Vincent Di Maio (born 1941), American pathologist

Italian-language surnames